Ignatius James Zyntell (April 27, 1910 – November 13, 1992) was an American football offensive lineman in the National Football League for the New York Giants and the Philadelphia Eagles.  He graduated from Boston College High School. He attended the College of the Holy Cross.  He also played in 1936-37 for the Boston Shamrocks Boston Shamrocks of the American Football League. Zyntell also has the distinction of being the last person, alphabetically, in the all-time NFL players' register.

References

1910 births
1992 deaths
American football guards
Boston Shamrocks (AFL) players
Holy Cross Crusaders football players
New York Giants players
Philadelphia Eagles players
Players of American football from Boston